The UEFA Women's Champions League 2009–10 was the first edition of the newly branded tournament, and the ninth edition of a UEFA tournament for women's champion football clubs.

For the first time the top 8 leagues of the UEFA were awarded two entry places in this year's season. Germany even got 3 entries, as FCR 2001 Duisburg finished outside the top 2 in Germany's league but gained entry as the title holder.

Teams

Qualifying round 

The draw was made on 24 June 2009. Teams in bold hosted a mini-league. The winners of each group qualified for the next round.

Group A 
Matches were played at City Stadium, Šiauliai and at the Aukštaitija Stadium, Panevėžys.

Group B 
Matches were played at Mladost Stadium, Strumica and Kukuš Stadium, Turnovo.

Group C 

Matches were played at Brøndby IF's bane 2 and Brøndby Stadium.

Group D

Matches were played at Matija Gubec Stadium, Krško and Ivančna Gorica Stadium, Ivančna Gorica.

Group E 

Matches were played at Folkungavallen, Linköping.

Group F 
Matches were played at Tsirion Stadium, Limassol and Pafiako Stadium, Paphos.

Group G 
Matches were played at Gradski vrt, Osijek and Stadion Cibalia, Vinkovci.

Main round

Bracket

Round of 32 

The 16 seeded teams were drawn one opponent each from the pool of 16 unseeded teams. Teams from the same association could not be drawn against each other. The seeded team played the second leg at home. Matches were played on 30 September and 7 October.

Round of 16 
From this round onwards, there was no seeding, and clubs from the same association could be drawn against each other. The drawing for this round was held immediately after the drawing for the round of 32. Therefore, instead of drawing specific teams matches were drawn with the winners playing each other in this round. Matches were played on 4–5 November and 11–12 November.

 1 Lyon originally won their match 5–0, but the UEFA Appeals Body awarded them a 0–3 defeat as they found Lyon guilty of fielding two ineligible appeals. Five weeks later, the Court of Arbitration for Sport upheld Lyon's appeal and reinstated the original result.

Quarter-finals 

Matches were played on 10 March and 14–17 March.

First Leg

Second Leg

Semi-finals 

Matches were played on 10–11 April and 17–18 April 2010.

First Leg

Second Leg

Final

Top goalscorers 
The top goal scorers including qualifying rounds were:

Round dates

References

 
Women's

UEFA
UEFA
UEFA Women's Champions League seasons